Beryozovsky Uyezd (Берёзовский уезд) was one of the subdivisions of the Tobolsk Governorate of the Russian Empire. It was situated in the northern part of the governorate. Its administrative centre was Beryozovo.

Demographics
At the time of the Russian Empire Census of 1897, Beryozovsky Uyezd had a population of 21,411. Of these, 51.8% spoke Khanty, 20.7% Nenets, 17.5% Russian, 9.4% Komi-Zyrian, 0.3% Mansi, 0.1% Yiddish and 0.1% Polish as their native language.

References

 
Uezds of Tobolsk Governorate
Tobolsk Governorate